Schmidt is a common German occupational surname derived from the German word "Schmied" meaning "blacksmith" and/or "metalworker". This surname is the German equivalent of "Smith" in the English-speaking world.

Schmidt German immigrants migrated to England and developed an understanding of English culture. Schmidt was commonly used in the English world as "Smith". Travelers would grow accustomed to the English, Irish, and Scottish change of lifestyle and eventually their names also changed. German migration to England was very common.

Geographical distribution
As of 2014, 64.9% of all known bearers of the surname Schmidt were residents of Germany (frequency 1:113), 18.2% of the United States (1:1,809), 3.7% of Brazil (1:5,058), 1.7% of Canada (1:1,936), 1.5% of Austria (1:503), 1.3% of Denmark (1:398), 1.1% of South Africa (1:4,469), 1.1% of Argentina (1:3,635) and 1.0% of France (1:6,167).

In Germany, the frequency of the surname was higher than national average (1:113) in the following states:
 1. Thuringia (1:60)
 2. Mecklenburg-Vorpommern (1:65)
 3. Saxony-Anhalt (1:66)
 4. Brandenburg (1:70)
 5. Hesse (1:84)
 6. Saarland (1:87)
 7. Saxony (1:92)
 8. Schleswig-Holstein (1:95)
 9. Lower Saxony (1:110)
 10. Rhineland-Palatinate (1:112)

In Denmark, the frequency of the surname was higher than national average (1:398) only in one region:
 1. Southern Denmark (1:215)

A–G
 Alexander Schmidt (physiologist) (1831–1894), Baltic German physiologist
 Alfred Schmidt (weightlifter) (1898–1972), Estonian weightlifter and Olympic medalist
 Alica Schmidt (born 1998), German runner
 Andreas Schmidt (baritone), born 1960, German classical singer
 Andreas Schmidt (footballer), born 1973, German footballer, twin brother of Oliver Schmidt
 Annie M. G. Schmidt (1911–1995), Dutch writer
 Arlo Schmidt (1931-2022), American politician and auctioneer
 Arno Schmidt  (1914–1979), German author and translator
 Arthur Schmidt (disambiguation)
 Bernhard Schmidt (1879–1935), Estonian-German astronomer, inventor of the Schmidt camera
 Bill Schmidt (baseball) (born 1959), American baseball executive
 Boss Schmidt (1880–1932), American major league catcher
 Brian Schmidt (born 1967), U.S.-Australian astrophysicist and Nobel laureate
 Brian L. Schmidt (born 1962), music composer for video games and pinball games
 Bryan Schmidt (born 1981), an American ice hockey player 
 Bryan Schmidt (footballer) (born 1995), an Argentine footballer
 Bryan Thomas Schmidt (born 1969), American writer and editor
 Burghart Schmidt (historian) (born 1962), German historian
 Burghart Schmidt (1942–2022), German philosopher
 Carl Schmidt (chemist) (1822–1894), Baltic German chemist
 Carl Friedrich Schmidt (disambiguation)
 Carmela Schmidt (born 1962), East German freestyle swimmer
 Carolina Schmidt (born 1967), Chilean politician and businesswoman
 Casper Schmidt (1842–1889), American politician
 Charles J. Schmidt (1907–1966), American politician
 Christian Schmidt (born 1957), German politician
 Clarke Schmidt (born 1996), American baseball player
 Colton Schmidt (born 1990), American football player
 Dagmar Schmidt (born 1973), German politician
 David Schmidt (disambiguation), several people
 Diane Grob Schmidt, American chemist
 Earl W. Schmidt (born 1936), American jurist and politician
 Eduard Oscar Schmidt (1823–1886), German zoologist and phycologist
 Erhard Schmidt (1876–1959), German mathematician
 Eric Schmidt (born 1955), executive chairman, former CEO, of Google
 Erich Schmidt (archaeologist) (1897–1964), German archaeologist
 Erich Schmidt (historian) (1853–1913) German historian of literature
 Ferenc Schmidt (1941–2011), Hungarian politician and MP
 Firmin Martin Schmidt (1918–2005), American Roman Catholic bishop
 Francis Schmidt (1885–1944), American college baseball coach
 Franklin J. W. Schmidt (1901–1935), American naturalist, brother of Karl Patterson
 Franz Schmidt (composer) (1874–1939), Austrian composer
 Frithjof Schmidt (born 1953), German politician
 Fritz Schmidt (disambiguation)
 Gavin Schmidt, Climatologist
 Gerhard Schmidt (crystallographer) (1919–1971), organic chemist and chemical crystallographer
 Gerhard Carl Schmidt (1865–1949), German chemist
 Gerhard Schmidt (art historian) (1924–2010), professor of the history of art
 Gunther Schmidt (born 1939), German mathematician
 Gunter Schmidt (born 1938), German sexologist
 Günter Schmidt (arachnologist) (1926–2016)

H–L
 Hans Christian Schmidt (born 1953), Danish politician
 Hans Schmidt (disambiguation)
 Hans-Thilo Schmidt (1888–1943), German spy for France in the 1930s
 Harald Schmidt (born 1957), German television entertainer
 Harry Schmidt (Air National Guard), US Air National Guard pilot
 Harry Schmidt (USMC) (1886–1968), US Marine Corps general
 Harvey Schmidt (1929–2018), American composer
 Heide Schmidt (born 1948), Austrian politician
 Heinrich Schmidt (philosopher) (1874-1935), German archivist, naturalist, philosopher, professor and disciple of Ernst Haeckel
 Heinrich Schmidt (politician) (1902–1960), NSDAP politician
 Heinrich Schmidt (physician) (1912–2000), medic at Majdanek extermination camp
 Heinrich Julian Schmidt (1818–1886), German journalist
 Heinrich Schmidt (footballer) (1912–1988), German footballer
 Helle Thorning-Schmidt (born 1966), Danish Prime Minister  
 Helmut Schmidt (footballer) (born 1949), German football player
 Helmut Schmidt (parapsychologist), German parapsychologist
 Helmut Schmidt (1918–2015), German chancellor
 Herbert B. Schmidt (born 1931), German economist
 Howard A. Schmidt (1949–2017), American computer security specialist
 Irmin Schmidt (born 1937), German rock keyboard player
 Isaac Jacob Schmidt (1779–1847), Dutch/Russian linguist and academician
 Jan Schmidt (director), Czech film director
 Jacques Schmidt (1933–1996), French costume designer
 Jason Schmidt (born 1973), American baseball player
 Jean Schmidt (born 1951), American politician
 Jean Dolores Schmidt (born 1919), American nun better known as Sister Jean
 Jessica Schmidt (born 1979), German chess grandmaster
 Joe Schmidt (American football) (born 1932), American football player
 Johann Kaspar Schmidt (1806–1856), German philosopher known as Max Stirner
 Johann Anton Schmidt (1823–1905), German botanist
 Josef Schmidt (rugby union) (born 1965), New Zealand rugby union coach
 Johannes Schmidt (biologist) (1877–1933), Danish biologist
 Johannes Schmidt (linguist) (1843–1901), German linguist
 Joost Schmidt (1893–1948), teacher at the Bauhaus
 Jordan Schmidt (born 1989), American music producer
 Josef Friedrich Schmidt (1871–1948), German board game inventor
 Joseph Hermann Schmidt (1804–1852), professor of Obstetrics in Berlin
 Joseph Schmidt (1904–1942), singer, actor
 Julius Schmidt (disambiguation)
 Justin O. Schmidt (entomologist), creator of the index of insect sting pain
 Jürgen Schmidt (born 1941), German speed skater
 Karl August von Schmidt (1840–1929), German geophysicist
 Karl Patterson Schmidt (1890–1957), Chief Curator of Zoology, Field Museum of Natural History
 Karl Schmidt-Rottluff (1884–1976), German painter
 Katherine Schmidt (1899–1978), American artist
 Kendall Schmidt (born 1990), American actor, singer
 Kurt Schmidt (1891–1945), German Lieutenant-General during the Second World War
 Luís Eduardo Schmidt (born 1979), Brazilian football player

M–Z
 Maarten Schmidt (1929–2022), Dutch-American astronomer
 Martin Schmidt (disambiguation), multiple people
 Max Schmidt (1818–1901), German painter
  (1920–2002), commandant Fürstengrube subcamp of Auschwitz, March 1944 – January 1945
 Michael Schmidt (disambiguation), multiple people
 Mike Schmidt (born 1949), American baseball player, third baseman for the Philadelphia Phillies
 Milt Schmidt (1918–2017), Canadian hockey player
 Monika Schmidt, Australian judge 
 Nate Schmidt (born 1991), American ice hockey player
 Noémie Schmidt (born 1990), Swiss actress
 Olaf Schmidt (born 1962), German glider aerobatic pilot
  (19282010), Danish conductor and composer
 Oliver Schmidt, born 1973, German footballer, twin brother of Andreas Schmidt (above)
 Olle Schmidt (born 1949), Swedish politician
 Oscar Schmidt (born 1958), Brazilian basketball player
 Otto Schmidt (1891–1956), Soviet scientist
 Otto Schmidt (aviator) (1885-1944), German flying ace
 Paul Schmidt (disambiguation), multiple people
 Peter Schmidt (disambiguation), multiple people
 Petra Schmidt (born 1963), German soprano
 Pyotr Schmidt (1867–1906, Russian revolutionary of 1905
 Renate Schmidt (born 1943), German Federal Minister for family affairs
 Rob Schmidt (born 1965), American film director and writer
 Sophie Schmidt, Canadian soccer player
 Stefan Schmidt (born 1981), German politician
 Steve Schmidt, American campaign strategist and public relations expert for the U.S. Republican Party
 Thomas Schmidt (footballer)
 Tim Schmidt (born 1986), Australian rules footballer
 Tony Schmidt (born 1980), German racing driver
 Torge Schmidt (born 1988), German politician
 Torsten Schmidt (disambiguation), multiple people
 Ulla Schmidt (born 1949), German Federal Minister for health
 Uwe Schmidt (born 1966), German politician
 Vasili Schmidt (1886–1938), Soviet politician and statesman
 Vera Schmidt (born 1982), Hungarian singer-songwriter
 Viktoria Schmidt-Linsenhoff (1944–2013), German art historian and professor
 Walter Schmidt (disambiguation), multiple people
 Wilhelm Schmidt (disambiguation), multiple people
 William Schmidt (disambiguation), multiple people
 Wilma Schmidt (1926–2022), German operatic soprano
 Wolfgang M. Schmidt (born 1933), mathematician

In fiction 
 Hildegarde Schmidt, character in Murder on the Orient Express

See also 
 Smith (surname)
 Schmitt (disambiguation)
 Schmitz
 Schmid
 Schmied
 Smits
 Šmits
 Smeets

References

German-language surnames
Occupational surnames
Russian Mennonite surnames